Pedro Cachín was the defending champion but lost in the semifinals to Casper Ruud.

Ruud won the title after defeating Taro Daniel 6–3, 6–4 in the final.

Seeds

Draw

Finals

Top half

Bottom half

References
Main Draw
Qualifying Draw

Copa Sevilla singles
Copa Sevilla - Singles